Reynoldsville is an unincorporated community in Union County, Illinois, United States. The community is along Illinois Route 3 and 146, just north of McClure and across the Mississippi River from Cape Girardeau, Missouri.

The unincorporated community has a major railroad passing through. A fishing lake, Lyerla Lake, is just to the east. Kornthal Church from 1852 is located in the community and Old Cape Road connects with Illinois Route 127.

Notes

External links
NACo

Unincorporated communities in Union County, Illinois
Unincorporated communities in Illinois